Knock Knock is a 1940 animated short subject, part of the Andy Panda series, produced by Walter Lantz. The cartoon is noted for being the first appearance of Woody Woodpecker, and was released by Universal Pictures on November 25, 1940.

Plot
The cartoon ostensibly stars Andy Panda (voice of Sara Berner) and his father, Papa Panda (voice of Mel Blanc), but it is Woody Woodpecker (voice of Blanc) who steals the show. Woody constantly pesters Papa Panda by pecking at his house roof, tempting him to try to kill the woodpecker with his shotgun. Andy, meanwhile, tries to sprinkle salt on Woody's tail in the belief that this will somehow capture the bird. To Woody's surprise, Andy's attempts prevail (comically, the mound of salt placed on Woody's tail is so heavy that he cannot run away), and in an ending very similar to Warner Bros.'s Daffy Duck & Egghead, two other woodpeckers arrive to take Woody to the insane asylum but then prove to be crazier than he is.

Production notes
Like most of the early 1940s Lantz cartoons, Knock Knock carried no director's credit. Lantz himself has claimed to have directed this cartoon, although more recent information has indicated that Alex Lovy was the actual director. The cartoon features animation by Lovy and Frank Tipper, a story by Ben Hardaway and Lowell Elliott, and music by Frank Marsales. Knock Knock was Marsales' final score for Lantz.

As the first appearance of Woody Woodpecker, Knock Knock is also the first cartoon to feature Woody's trademark laugh, a gurgling cackle voice artist Mel Blanc had been perfecting since high school. This is also the laugh Blanc used for Happy Rabbit, a predecessor to Bugs Bunny in the 1939 cartoon Hare-um Scare-um. This cartoon is also notable for featuring a very crude Woody design, something that was softened by 1942 and later changed into a much more realistic and easier to animate woodpecker by 1944. This first design featured Woody with red "vest feathers" (instead of white), buck teeth in some shots, thick ringed legs, two green tail feathers and a big chin which made him look more like a pelican than a woodpecker. The short almost never saw the light of the day because then distributor Bernie Krieser (representing Universal) thought Woody was the ugliest thing he had ever seen. Lantz told him, "You're not paying for these pictures, All you're doing is distributing them, so release him, because I'm taking a chance". So then Krieser took it back and asked for a series as the short was a hit.

Woody's first words are his trademark "Guess who?" as he pops through the roof of Andy Panda's house, except the voice is normal-sounding instead of sped-up as Woody's voice normally would be.

References

External links
 
 

1940 short films
1940 animated films
1940s American animated films
1940 comedy films
Films directed by Walter Lantz
Walter Lantz Productions shorts
Woody Woodpecker films
Films scored by Frank Marsales
Andy Panda films
Universal Pictures animated short films
Animated films about birds
American comedy short films
1940s English-language films
Animated films about bears
Films about giant pandas
Universal Pictures short films